The Women's slalom competition at the FIS Alpine World Ski Championships 2019 was held on 16 February 2019. A qualification was scheduled to take place on 15 February, but was cancelled.

Results
Run 1 was started at 11:00 and run 2 at 14:30.

References

Women's slalom